Acantopsis spectabilis is a species of fish found in Thailand. The species is known from the Irrawaddy River and Salween River in Thailand and Myanmar and possibly the Chindwin River. There are no known conservation actions and the species is thought to be threatened by planned dams on the rivers it inhabits.

References

External links 
Fishbase.org profile

Fish of Thailand
Fish described in 1860
Taxa named by Edward Blyth